The Bulgarian Part of Speech-annotated Corpus (BulPosCor) (in Bulgarian: Български Пос анотиран корпус (БулПосКор)) is a morphologically annotated general monolingual corpus of written language where each item in a text is assigned a grammatical tag. BulPosCor is created by the Department of Computational Linguistics at the Institute for Bulgarian Language of the Bulgarian Academy of Sciences and consists of 174 697 lexical items.
BulPosCor has been compiled from the Structured "Brown" Corpus of Bulgarian by sampling 300+ word-excerpts (expanded to sentence boundary) from the original BCB files in such a way as to preserve the BCB overall structure. The annotation process consists of a primary stage of automatically assigning tags from the Bulgarian Grammar Dictionary and a stage of manual resolving of morphological ambiguities. The disambiguated corpus consists of 174,697 lexical units.

Access 
BulPOSCor Search Interface

See also 
 Corpus linguistics
 Natural Language Processing
 Bulgarian National Corpus

References 
Koeva, Sv. Gramatichen Rechnik na Balgarskiya ezik.Opisanie na koncepciyata za organizaciyata na lingvistichnite danni. (Grammatical Dictionary of Bulgarian.), в: Български език, 6, 1998, с. 49-58.
Koeva, Sv., Sv. Leseva, I. Stoyanova, E. Tarpomanova, M. Todorova. Bulgarian Tagged Corpora, Proceedings of the Fifth International Conference Formal Approaches to South Slavic and Balkan Languages, 18–20 October 2006, Sofia, Bulgaria, pp. 78–86.
Todorova, Maria, Rositsa Dekova. Balgarski POS anotiran korpus – osobenosti na gramatichnata anotaciya. (Bulgarian POS annotated corpus – specifics of the grammatical annotation) в: Езикови ресурси и технологии за български език. Състав. и научн. ред. Св. Коева, Д. Благоева, Т. Тинчев. София: Академично издателство „Марин Дринов“, 2014.

External links 
Department of Computational Linguistics
Grammatical Dictionary of Bulgarian

Computational linguistics
Bulgarian language